Approximately 466 million people or 5% of the worlds population has disabling hearing loss (term defined and used by the World Health Organisation) and 34 million of these are children.  Despite approximately one third of people over 65 years of age being affected by disabling hearing loss  deaf adult characters are under significantly under represented in children's books; even within books which do include a deaf character. There have been several studies into how Deaf children are portrayed in children's literature. Historically children's books have generally conformed to an outdated cultural view of Deaf people, which resulted in books which portray those characters who happen to be Deaf as in need of saving or to be pitied. In more recent times society has improved attitudes towards d/Deaf people and this has led in part to better representation in literature. This article highlights some of the books which reflect the diversity found within the deaf community. 

There have been several campaigns such as "toy like me" and "in the picture"  (by Scope UK) to encourage toy manufacturers and children's publishers to more accurately reflect society.  In response to these campaigns there has been a gradual increase in the quality and quantity of Deaf characters in children's books. BookTrust, a UK children's charity have is strators and publishers on h   ow to naturally include Deaf and disabled characters in children's books. 

The term 'Deaf' is generally used to refer to a linguistic and cultural minority group who use sign language and are members of Deaf culture. The term 'deaf' or 'hard of hearing' is commonly used to refer to individuals with partial deafness or hearing loss. People who identify as hard of hearing or small 'd' deaf are generally not members of the Deaf sign language using community. This distinction is useful in academic settings where precision is needed but for the purpose of this article the term 'deaf' is used to include characters with any level of deafness/hearing loss and instead their communication styles, use of hearing technology or none and cultural setting such as living with a hearing family or being part of the Deaf Sign Language using community to enable to the reader to form their own judgements on where the character falls on the Deaf/hearing culture continuum. As in real life many fictional characters participate at least in part in both Deaf and hearing cultures and manage cross cultural relationships.

Board books for young children featuring D/deaf characters 
Books are listed by publication date, although books are only included in the list if they have a deaf character some books also contain illustrations of other disabled characters and so when present this information has also been included in the table. Deaf adult characters are highlighted in Bold.

Picture books with D/deaf characters 

The books are listed in date order. D/deaf authors and illustrators are highlighted in bold.

Early Reader's Books with D/Deaf characters 
The books are listed in date order. D/deaf authors and illustrators are highlighted in bold.

Comics with D/deaf characters 
The Comics are listed in date order.

Graphic novels with D/deaf characters 
The graphic novels are listed in date order.

Middle grade books with D/deaf characters 
The readers of these books are expected to be approximately between the ages of 8 and 12 years of age. Deaf authors names are highlighted in Bold. The books are listed in date order.
{| class="wikitable sortable"
|-
!Title
!Author
!Deaf characters / Awards won
!Readers Age
!Topic's, Themes
!Year 1st Published
|-
|Lizzie & Lucky: The Mystery of the Missing Dog
|Megan Rix, 
Tim Budgen
|The central character, Lizzie (8) is deaf. In the book she lives at home with her deaf parents, they all wear colourful bilateral hearing aids and at-home use BSL to communicate. Accessibility is gently addressed when the characters experience communication difficulties such as trying to lip-read in the dark, when people don't speak clearly or turn away mid-sentence and not everyone uses or understands BSL. They make a video relay call to the police through a BSL interpreter. 
|6 - 8 yrs
|Dog lovers, Detective
|2021
|-
|Lizzie & Lucky: The Mystery of the Missing Puppies
|Megan Rix, 
Tim Budgen
|The central character, Lizzie (8) is deaf. In the book she lives at home with her deaf parents, they all wear colourful bilateral hearing aids and at home use BSL to communicate. 
|6 - 8 yrs
|Dog lovers, Detective
|2021
|-
|
|
|
|
|
|
|-
|Normal: One Kid's Extraordinary Journey
|Magdalena Newman, Nathaniel Newman
|This book is an autobiography of Nathaniel (15) life, he has severe treacher collins syndrome and has had 67 operations to him be able to breathe, eat and hear better, the book includes graphic information on his treatment. He wears BAHA hearing aids. This book is co-written with his Mum.
|10-14 yrs
|Treacher collins syndrome Autobiography
|2020
|-
|Now Hear This: Harper soars with her magic ears
|Valli Gideons, Harper Gideons, Priscila Soares
|The central character Harper has one Cochlear implant and one hearing aid. It discusses different communication methods including speech and ASL and different hearing technology including Baha hearing aids, 
|7-12 yrs
|Deaf awareness
|2020
|-
|TURBO Racers: Escape Velocity
|Austin Aslan
|The central character is a 12-year-old CODA. Both his parents are Deaf ASL users. He is fluent in ASL.
|8-12 yrs
|Racing
|2020
|-
|Harriet Versus the Galaxy
|Samantha Baines
|The central character Harriet (10) wears hearing aids and uses speech to communicate. When she finds herself defending the human race against extra-terrestrial characters with her Gran she discovers that her hearing aids as well as amplifying sound can also tune into the wavelength of many languages. There is a non-binary character called Robin also in the book. Harriet lives with her Gran whilst her Dad is away driving lorries and there is no mention of her Mother. The book has lots of black and white illustrations.
|7 - 11 yrrs
|Space adventure
|2019
|-
|Joss: Touch the Sky - Book 2 (Girl of the Year 2020)
|Erin Falligant
Maike Plenzke
|This book is made by the company 'American doll' and so a matching doll is also available. The main character Joss (10) was born profoundly deaf in her left ear and some hearing in her right ear. She wears a hearing aid on her right ear (sometimes with a headband.) She predominately uses speech to communicate at School but her Mum uses ASL when communicating with her and her friends and brother sign to her when she isn't wearing her hearing aid e.g. when she's on the beach. She takes her hearing aid out for some activities such as surfing and uses an FM system at the cheerleading gym. She requests that her friends face her when speaking to her and sit on her right side and sometimes she needs to ask them to repeat themselves etc.
|8 - 10yrs
|Friendship, Surfing And Family
|2019
|-
|Joss - Book 1 (Girl of the Year 2020)
|Erin Falligant

Maike Plenzke
|This book is made by the company 'American doll' and so a matching doll is also available. The main character Joss (10) was born profoundly deaf in her left ear and some hearing in her right ear. She wears a hearing aid on her right ear (sometimes with a headband.) She predominately uses speech to communicate at School but her Mum uses ASL when communicating with her and her friends and brother sign to her when she isn't wearing her hearing aid e.g. when she's on the beach. She takes her hearing aid out for some activities such as surfing and uses an FM system at the cheerleading gym. She requests that her friends face her when speaking to her and sit on her right side and sometimes she needs to ask them to repeat themselves etc.
|8 - 10 yrs
|Friendship, Surfing And Family
|2019
|-
|Toad Attack!
|Patrice Lawrence,
Becka Moor
|Rosa is one of the two main characters wears a hearing aid and uses sign language and lip-reading to communicate. She has two Dads. This book has a dyslexia-friendly layout.
|8 - 10 yrs
|Mystery, Friendship
|2019
|-
|The Sound of Silence, Growing up with Deaf parents
|Myron Uhlberg
|This book is an adaptation of Myron Uhlberg's memoir 'Hands of My Father containing details of his childhood as the hearing Son of Deaf parents.
|9-12 yr
|Autobiography
|2019
|-
|TURBO Racers: Trailblazer
|Austin Aslan
|The central character is a 12-year-old CODA. Both his parents are Deaf ASL users. He is fluent in ASL.
|8 - 12 yr
|Racing
|2018
|-
|You Don't Know Everything, Jilly P!
|Alex Gino
|The central character is a 12-year-old girl and her parents have a baby, Emma, that is born deaf. The book includes their initial feelings of grief and consultations with professionals where they are encouraged to consider a CI and not to use gestures or ASL with their baby. The main Deaf character is Derek who is Deaf, Black and uses ASL as his first language. He attends California School for the Deaf. There are several other Deaf characters in the story.
|8-12 yr
|Racism & Attitudes towards difference including Deafness.
|2018
|-
|Diary of a Hard of Hearing Kid
|Isaiah John Baier
|This memoir is written by 11 years old Isaiah, he became deaf after having meningitis at 20 months olds and wears a hearing aid on one ear and a cochlear implant on the other side and uses speech when communicating.
|8+ yrs
|Humorous / autobiographical 11 year olds diary
|2018
|-
|Left Out
|Tim Green
|The central character Landon (12) is Deaf and has cochlear implants and uses speech to communicate.
|8-12 yr
|Sports fiction - American Football
|2017
|-
|Macy McMillan and the Rainbow Goddess
|Shari Green
|The central character Macy (12) is Deaf and uses ASL to communicate as well as note writing. This book won the ALA Schneider Family Book Award, for Middle Grade Books in 2018 and has been shortlisted for many other awards.
|8-12 yr
|Friendships & family life
|2017
|-
|Echo Comes Home
|Megan Rix
|The central character Jake (11) became deaf after having meningitis as a younger child. He wears attends a mainstream school and wears hearing aids and uses lip reading and ASL to communicate better. He is lonely and longs for a hearing dog.
|9-11 yrs
|Animal lovers
|2016
|-
|Feel the Sound
|Evangeline Duran Fuentes
|One of the main characters Jake (12) became deaf after having meningitis. He uses ASL to communicate with his Mum and in the story, he teaches two friends ASL. He does not wear hearing aids.
|9-12 yrs
|Friendships and relationships
|2015
|-
|Destiny And Faith Get Stuck In The Country (Destiny and Faith series)
|Teddy O'Malley,
Angie Dickens
|One of the characters Dustin is Deaf and uses ASL to communicate. There is another character called Cissy who is blind.
|6-9 yrs
|Friendship and Adventure
|2015
|-
|Silence in the Wild: A Summer in Maine
|Dale C. Jellison
|The central character Jake (12) wears a hearing aid. He loses his hearing aid when he gets left alone in a remote area.
|7-12 yrs
|Friendship and Adventure
Set in 1986 American Camp
|2014
|-
|Destiny and Faith Go To Twincentric Academy! (Destiny and Faith series)
|Teddy O'Malley, Angie Dickens
|One of the characters Dustin is Deaf and uses ASL to communicate.
|6-9 yrs
|Friendship and Adventure
|2014
|-
|Destiny And Faith’s Summer Adventures
(Destiny and Faith series #2)
|Teddy O'Malley, Angie Dickens
|One of the characters Dustin is Deaf and uses ASL to communicate, other characters sign fluently despite never meeting a Deaf person before.
|6-9 yrs
|Friendship and Adventure
|2014
|-
|Wonder
|R. J. Palacio
|The central character August (10) has a craniofacial syndrome called treacher collins syndrome and has had 27 surgeries to correct the facial anomalies he was born. He also wears BAHA hearing aids. In the book, he starts attending the local mainstream school where he is bullied. This book is written from a variety of perspectives. This book is required reading for 4-5 graders at schools across the USA. The book was made into a film but in the film, August still has the craniofacial syndrome but no longer has hearing loss so does not wear BAHA hearing aids. This book is a New York Times bestseller and is on Time Magazine's 100 Best Young Adult Books of All Time and on the Publishers Weekly and Kirkus Reviews List of Best of Children's Books amongst many others. 
|8-12 yrs
|Learning to accept others
|2012
|-
|The Salt-Stained Book (Strong Winds Trilogy #1)
|Julia Jones, Claudia Myatt
|The main character Donny (13) is a CODA, his Mother is Skpe is Profoundly Deaf and dyslexic and uses BSL to communicate.
|9 yrs +
|Sailing
|2011
|-
|A Ravelled Flag(Strong Winds Trilogy #2)
|Julia Jones, Claudia Myatt
|The main character Donny (14) is a CODA. His Mother Skpe is Profoundly Deaf and dyslexic and uses BSL to communicate.
|9 yrs +
|Sailing
|2011
|-
|Young Thomas Edison
|Sterling North
|This book is a biography of Thomas Edison. He became deaf at approximately 8–12 years of age. Study notes
|5-11 yrs
|American History 
|2009
|-
|Mask of the Jackal
|Christine Harris
|One of the main characters Jordy is deaf. In the book, Jordy uses Auslan to communicate.
|9-12 yrs
|Thriller
|2008
|-
|Rally Caps
|Stephen Culter,
Jodi Cutler
|One of the main characters in the book Luca (10ish) is Deaf and has a cochlear implant.
|8-12 yrs
|Sports Fiction -Baseball
|2007
|-
|The Smart Princess and Other Deaf Tales
|Keelin Carey Kristina GuevremontNicole Marsh 
|This collection of short stories written by Canadian Deaf children, the book includes several different Deaf characters, including Deaf friends, sign language and an adult that discourages sign language.
|8-12 yrs
|Friendships And Deaf identity
|2007
|-
|Changes for Julie 1974
(American Girl: Julie #6)
|Megan McDonald
|One of the main characters Joy (9) is deaf and uses lip-reading, ASL and unclear speech to communicate whilst attending the local mainstream school. 
|8 yrs+
|Set in 1970s America
|2007
|-
|Feathers
|Jacqueline Woodson 
|The central characters brother is a Deaf ASL user called Sean, he is also a Black African-American. This book won a Newbery Honor in 2008.
|9-12 yrs
|Set in the 1970s / race / region and understanding difference 
|2007
|-
|Nobody's Perfect
(Deaf Child Crossing #2)
|Marlee Matlin|The central character Megan (9) is Deaf ASL user and she attends a mainstream school and has a Sign language interpreter with her at School. A secondary character Justin is autistic and Megan teaches him some ASL.
|8-12 yrs
|Friendship
|2007
|-
|Deaf Culture Fairy Tales
|Roz Rosen,
Yiqiao Wang
|This collection of 20 adapted classic short stories eg. Beauty and the beast, each story has been adapted to include Deaf characters or characters that sign in ASL in every story. Some characters are "mute" and other have speech lessons.
|?
|Deaf culture / ASL Fairy tales
|2007
|-
|Leading Ladies (Deaf Child Crossing #3)
|Marlee Matlin|The central character Megan (9) is Deaf ASL user and she attends a mainstream school and has a Sign language interpreter with her at School. Lizzie (9) her best friend from camp transfers to her School and is a main character, she is Deaf and an ASL user too.
|8-12 yrs
|Friendship / sign language 
|2007
|-
|Singing Hands
|Delia Ray 
|The central character Gussie (12) is one of three hearing children born to a Deaf Couple (CODA.) Her Father, Reverend Davis is Deaf as is her Mother. They are both ASL users. In the story, she takes part in a trip with Alabama School for the Deaf. As the book is set in the Deaf community there are several other Deaf characters including Abe a Black Deaf child who attends Alabama School for the Deaf. The book is partially based on the author's Mother's CODA's experience. This book was a Book Sense Summer 2006 Children’s Pick, A 2007 Notable Children’s Trade Book in the Field of Social Studies, Named to the 2007 Bank Street Best Children’s Books of the Year List
and a Kansas’ William Allen White Award Nominee, 2008-09.
|10-14 yrs
|Set in America in the 1940s / Racium
|2006
|-
|Smart Princess:And Other Deaf Tales
|Canadian Cultural Society of the Deaf
|This compilation of five short stories was written by Deaf young people and Deaf young adults that won the Ladder Awards competition. This collection of five short stories feature a range of Deaf characters. including a young princess Lyla who would one day be queen, and how she runs away from her Aunt Belle, who refuses to learn sign language. In another story, a Deaf child is teased in her mainstream school for being Deaf until she moves to the Newfoundland School for the Deaf, the group of Deaf and hearing astronauts end up on a planet where hearing people have special needs.
|7 - 9yrs
|
|2005
|-
|Teamwork at Camp Tiago
(Keystone Stables #4)
|Marsha Hulber
|One of the main characters Jonathan is Deaf and uses ASL to communicate. The book is set on an American special needs Summer camp and one of the other main characters lives in foster care and has completed a crash course in ASL so can communicate with Jonathon. This book contains a Christian message. This book was reprinted in 2009 under the new title Summer Camp Adventures.
|9-12 yrs
|Foster care, Horse care,
Animal Lovers
|2005 (reprinted in 2009)
|-
|Helen Keller: A photographic story of a life
|Leslie Garrett Annie Tremmel Wilcox
|This book is a biography of Helen Keller, she became Deaf-Blind at 19 months old after an illness. She initially was taught through a manual alphabet and then learned to speak and 'read lip' through touching the speaker's lips. She was also proficient in braille.
|10-14 yrs
|Biography America 1980s onwards
|2004
|-
|Deaf Child Crossing (Deaf Child Crossing #1)
|Marlee Matlin|The main character Megan (10) is Deaf and uses ASL and "voice that sounded different to others" to communicate. One of her friends learns some ASL.
|8-12 yrs
|Friendship
|2004
|-
|Who was Helen Keller
|Gare Thompson, Nancy Harrison
|This is a biography of Helen Keller. Part of a #1 New York Times bestselling series.
|8-12 yr
|Biography America 1980s onwards
|2003
|-
|Amelia Lends a Hand (Amelia's Notebooks #12)
|Marissa Moss
|One of the main characters Enzo is Deaf and uses ASL to communicate. He doesn't hear the main character when she calls to him, but he later teaches her ASL. Journal style Book, it contains plenty of doodle style pictures. Printed by American Girl.
|9-12 yrs
|Friendship 
|2002
|-
|Deafness (Living with)
|Emma Haughton
|This book factual approaches deafness through looking at the lives of a group of deaf children and one deaf adult; it discusses BSL different levels of hearing loss, technology and its limitations and touches on BSL, through deaf culture isn't really discussed properly.
|10-12 yrs
|Deaf children
|2002
|-
|The Mystery of the Totems (Flying Fingers Club Book 5/5)
|Jean F. Andrews
|One of the two main characters is a boy called Matt who is Deaf and uses ASL to communicate.
|8-12 yrs
|Friendship & Detective group
|2001
|-
|Super-Tuned!
|Heather Hammonds
|The central character Nick has hearing aids and uses speech and lip-reading to communicate. His hearing aid tunes into a boat in distress.
|5-9 yrs
|Rescues 
|2001
|-
|River of Hands
|Shron Kirsh|This collection of four short stories by young Deaf authors and illustrators includes Deaf character in each story and references to sign language. The contributors have all won the ladder awards. A project of Canadian Cultural Society of the Deaf
|7-11 yr
|Short stories
|2000
|-
|Doggy Dare
(Animal Ark Pets #12)
|Ben M. Baglio (pseudonym Lucy Daniels)
|One of the main characters, Joey is deaf and isn't allowed much dependence by his Mother so some children train a stray dog to be a hearing dog so they can keep him. The books originally were published in England, under the pseudonym Lucy Daniels in 1988.)
|6-8 yrs
|Animal lovers
|2000
|-
|Nick's Secret
(Nick's Mission #2)
|Claire H. Blatchford|The central character Nick (14) became Deaf aged 6 after having meningitis and communicates using lip-reading and speech. He has regular speech therapy sessions and attends a mainstream school.
|9 -12 yrs
|Children's Mystery series
|2000
|-
|Dovey Coe
|Frances O'Roark Dowell
|One of the main characters Amos (13) is deaf and uses ASL to communicate with the dogs. He goes on to become a sign language teacher as an adult. The main character is accused of murder. This book won the William Allen White Children's Book Award (2013) and Edgar Award, Best Children's (2001).
|10-12 yrs
|Historical Mystery set in the 1920s America
|2000
|-
|Can You Feel the Thunder
|Lynn E. McElfresh
|One of the main characters Stephanie is DeafBlind. The book is told from her younger brother's (13) perspective and his mixed feelings about his older DeafBlind sister. She uses touch and tactile signed manual alphabet to communicate.
|9-14 years
|Accepting a family member
|1999
|-
|Dangerous Games
(The Wolves Chronicles #5)
|Joan Aiken MBE
|The Islands King is Deaf. This book is also published in the UK under the title Limbo Lodge.
|12-15 yrs
|Fantasy historical fiction
|1999
|-
|Going with the Flow
|Claire Blatchford|The central character Mark (11) is the only deaf child in his mainstream school. He became deaf after having meningitis aged 3, he wears hearing aids and has an ASL interpreter in class with him.
|8-10 yrs
|Friendship, angry and loneliness
|1998
|-
|Hannie
|Barbara Luetke-Stahlman
|Two of the main characters are Deaf sisters. Based on the true story and written by Hannah's Mother.
|11 yrs
|Deaf siblings
|1996
|-
|Tuck Triumphant (Tuck #2)
|Theodore Taylor
|One of the main characters is a Chok-do wo is adopted and is from Koren. He is referred to as "deaf-mute". The dog Tuck is blind.
|9 yrs +
|Adoption Friendship
|1996
|-
|Gaps in Stone Walls
|John Neufield
|The central character Merry (12) is Deaf and uses sign language to communicate. This book is set in Chilmark Martha's Vineyard in the 1880s, where at least a fifth of the population had hereditary deafness so sign language was widely used by Deaf and hearing people across island life. So the book contains a range of characters which sign, some Deaf, some hearing. 
|10-14 yrs
|Murder mystery
|1996
|-
|The Deadly Chase (The Colonial Captives #2)
|Angela Elwell Hunt
|The book lightly touches on the history of slave trading and is set on a transatlantic boat filled with children soon to be sold into slavery. One of the characters is a deaf girl who tries to save a baby whale. This book also has a religious theme: a Jewish boy accepts Christ and becomes a Christian.
|10-13 yrs
|Historical fiction set in 1627
|1996
|-
|Cheshire Moon
|Nancy Butts
|The central character Miranda (aged 13) is Deaf and uses ASL, lipreading and speech to communicate. Her parents insist that she speaks instead of signing.
|10+ yrs
|Fantasy
|1996
|-
|Signs in Success
Profiles of Deaf Americans
|Ron Podmore
|This book is the biographies of five different Deaf Americans including Marlee Matlin and the first Deaf president of Gallaudet University I. King Jordan.
|8+ yr
|Biography's
|1995
|-
|Deaf Communities
A Worldwide Perspective
|Jack Olson
|This books explorers Deaf experiences in different countries.
|11-13 yrs
|Deaf culture
|1995
|-
|Thanks A Lot!
|Lucille Kraiman
|The central character Jordan is moved from a School for the Deaf, where sign language is used, to a mainstream school with a deaf student cannot sign and uses speech to communicate.
|8-18 yrs
|Friendship
|1995
|-
|Nick's Mission
(Nick's Mission #1)
|Claire H. Blatchford|The central character Nick (13) became Deaf aged 6 after having meningitis and communicates using lip-reading and speech. He has regular speech therapy sessions and attends a mainstream school.
|9-12 yrs
|Children's mystery series
|1994
|-
|The Ghost of Tomahawk Creek (Flying Fingers Club 4/5)
|Jean F. Andrews, 
|One of the two main characters is a boy called Matt who is Deaf and uses ASL to communicate.
|9 - 12 yrs
|Friendship & detective group
|1993
|-
|Laurent Clerc: The Story of His Early Years
|Cathryn Carroll, Harlan L. Lane
|This fictionalised autobiography of Laurent Cleric covers his early life a Deaf student in France and then how he came to co-found the first Deaf for the Deaf in North America and develop new teaching methods including the use of ASL. Published by Gallaudet University Press.
|
|American Deaf History
|1991, reprinted in 2002
|-
|Hasta Luego, San Diego
(Flying Fingers Club Book 3/5)
|Jean F. Andrews
|One of the two main characters is a boy called Matt who is Deaf and uses ASL to communicate. Printed by Gallaudet University Press.
|8 - 12 yrs
|Friendship & detective group
|1991
|-
|Secret in the Dorm Attic, The (Flying Fingers Club Book 2/5)
|Jean F. Andrews
|One of the two main characters is a boy called Matt who is Deaf and uses ASL to communicate. This book is set in Matts residential Deaf school so includes other Deaf characters. Printed by Gallaudet University Press.
|9-12 yrs
|Friendship & detective group
|1990
|-
|Jessi's Secret Language
(The Baby-Sitters Club #16)
|Ann M. Martin
|One of the main characters Matt (young child) was born Deaf, he uses ASL to communicate. He teaches his babysitter ASL and they teach other interested children as well.
|8-12 yrs
|Friendships
|1988
|-
|The Flying Fingers Club (The Flying Fingers Club Book 1/5)
|Jean F. Andrews
|One of the main characters is Matt is Deaf and uses ASL to communicate. He teaches the central character Donald, who has a learning disability, to sign in ASL. Gallaudet University Press.
|9-12 yrs
|Friendship & detective group
|1988
|-
|All Alone (Except for My Dog Friday)
|Claire Blatchford'''
|The central character Margret (12) is deaf and she is sure that no-one understands what it's like to be deaf apart from the dog.
|9-12 yrs
|Isolation & Animals
|1983
|-
|Hero|Christina Bridges
|One of the two main characters Jacob is Deaf. His ability to read lips makes him the 'hero' of the story,
|7-12 yrs
|Friendship & detective story
|1982
|-
|Apple is my sign|Troy Howell, Mary Riskind
|The central character Harry (10) is Deaf and is sent the residential Mr Bertie's School for the Deaf, in Philadelphia. His family are Deaf and sign ASL discreetly in public. His family live on an Apple farm so his Sign name is Apple. The book is set at the residential Deaf School where he meets other Deaf children including Landis who parents encourage him to talk and lipread.
|10-12 yrs
|Set in 1899, Adventure
|1981
republished in 1993
|-
|Child of the Silent Night|Edith Fisher Hunter, 
Bea Holmes 
|This book is based on the true story of Laura Bridgman who became deaf-blind and lost her sense of smell/taste aged 2 after an illness (possibly scarlet fever.) She could read Braille and used tactile sign language to communicate. She spent most of her school and adult life at the Perkins Institution for the Blind. She was born fifty years before Helen Keller.
|9-12 yrs
|A slightly fictionalised account of Laura Bridgman's life, 1829-1889
|1963, reprinted in 1971
|}

 Young Adult books with D/deaf characters 
The readers of these book are expected to be between the ages of 12 and 18 years of age. The books are in date order.

 Books for Adults with D/deaf characters 

See also
British Sign Language
American Sign Language Literature
Disability in children's literature
Disability in the arts

References

Further reading
Brittain, Isabel. An Examination into the Portrayal of Deaf Characters and Deaf Issues in Picture Books for Children.'' Disability Studies Quarterly Winter 2004, Volume 24, No. 1.

External links
The Listen Up Web
Myshelf book list
Reading Foundation

Deaf
Literature about deaf people
Deaf culture
Children's books, Deaf
Children's books